Emil Hass Christensen (23 January 1903 – 12 January 1982) was a Danish film actor. He appeared in 60 films between 1925 and 1978. He was born in Frederiksberg, Denmark and died in Denmark.

Selected filmography 

 Cirkusrevyen 1936 – 1936
  – 1943
  – 1951
  – 1951
 Det sande ansigt – 1951
 Vejrhanen – 1952
  – 1952
 Adam og Eva – 1953
 The Crime of Tove Andersen – 1953
 En sømand går i land – 1954
 Ordet – 1955
  – 1955
  – 1956
 Taxa K-1640 Efterlyses – 1956
  – 1956
 Englen i sort – 1957
 Sønnen fra Amerika – 1957
  – 1957
  – 1958
  – 1958
  – 1958
 Styrmand Karlsen – 1958
 Wir Wunderkinder (tysk) – 1958
 Vi er allesammen tossede – 1959
 Onkel Bill fra New York – 1959
 Baronessen fra benzintanken – 1960
  – 1960
 Komtessen – 1961
 Peters baby – 1961
 Støv på hjernen – 1961
  – 1962
 Peters landlov – 1963
  – 1964
 Sytten – 1965
  – 1965
 Min søsters børn – 1966
  – 1967
 Hurra for de blå husarer – 1970
 Nøglen til Paradis – 1970
  – 1972
  – 1973
  – 1975
  – 1976
  – 1978

References

External links 
 

1903 births
1982 deaths
20th-century Danish male actors
Best Actor Bodil Award winners
Danish male film actors
Danish male silent film actors
People from Frederiksberg